The Deputy Governor of Abia State is the second-highest official of the Government of Abia State who acts as the subordinate to the Governor. The Deputy Governor is selected as a running-mate by the gubernatorial nominee of a party after the primary elections. On 28 May 2015, Ude Oko Chukwu was sworn-in as the current Deputy Governor of Abia State after he was elected into office during the 2015 Nigerian election.

Qualifications
As in the case of the Governor, in order to be qualified to be elected as Deputy Governor, a person must:
be at least thirty-five (35) years of age;
be a Nigerian citizen by birth;
be a member of a political party with endorsement by that political party;
have School Certificate or its equivalent.

Responsibilities
The Deputy Governor assists the Governor in exercising primary assignments and is also eligible to replace a dead, impeached, absent or ill Governor as required by the 1999 Constitution of Nigeria.

See also
Governor of Abia State
Government of Abia State

References

Deputy Governors of Abia State
Executive Council of Abia State